A Pair of Kings is a 1922 American silent comedy film featuring Oliver Hardy.

Plot
As described in a film magazine, King August (Semon) is threatened with a revolution and death, so he abdicates in favor of the Stranger (Semon), a dockworker who looks like the King, who is hidden in a box and smuggled into the palace. The new ruler proves too lively for the plotters, and after smashing numerous vases over their heads, the plotters are dumped into a cistern beneath the palace. The dockworker is knighted by the newly crowned queen (Carlisle).

Cast
 Larry Semon as King August / Stranger
 Lucille Carlisle as Princess Lucille
 Oliver Hardy as General Alarm (credited as Babe Hardy)
 William Hauber as Bit Role (uncredited)
 Joe Rock as Bit Role (uncredited)

See also
 Oliver Hardy filmography

References

External links

1922 films
American silent short films
American black-and-white films
1922 comedy films
1922 short films
Films directed by Larry Semon
Films directed by Norman Taurog
Silent American comedy films
American comedy short films
1920s American films